Sabine Peters (29 December 1912 – 10 October 1982) was a German film actress. Peters emerged as a film actress during the Nazi era, and played largely supporting roles. She was one of the companions of the title in the 1938 Ingrid Bergman vehicle The Four Companions.

She was married to the baritone Willi Domgraf-Fassbaender. The mezzo-soprano Brigitte Fassbaender is their daughter.

Selected filmography
 Eight Girls in a Boat (1932)
 Ripening Youth (1933)
 The Girl Irene (1936)
 The Castle in Flanders (1936)
 The Beaver Coat (1937)
 Talking About Jacqueline (1937)
The Chief Witness (1937)
 The Glass Ball (1937)
 The Night of Decision (1938)
 The Four Companions (1938)
 A Prussian Love Story (1938)
 Friedemann Bach (1941)
 The Marriage of Figaro (1949)

References

Bibliography 
 Chandler, Charlotte. Ingrid: Ingrid Bergman, A Personal Biography. Simon and Schuster, 2007.

External links 
 

1912 births
1982 deaths
German film actresses
Actresses from Berlin
20th-century German actresses